Marcello Couto Antony de Farias better known as Marcello Antony (born 28 January 1965) is a Brazilian actor. He lives in Cascais, Portugal.

Filmography

References

External links 
 

1965 births
Living people
Male actors from Rio de Janeiro (city)
Brazilian male television actors
Brazilian male telenovela actors
Brazilian male film actors